Bayard is a French surname. Notable people with the surname include:

Bayard family, a prominent American family of lawyers and politicians founded by Nicholas Bayard
Alexis I. du Pont Bayard (1918–1985), American politician from Delaware
Émile Bayard (1837–1891), French illustrator
George Dashiell Bayard (1835–1862), Union Army general in the American Civil War 
Hippolyte Bayard (1801–1877), French photography pioneer
James A. Bayard (politician, born 1767) (1767–1815), American politician from Delaware, US representative and senator
James A. Bayard Jr. (1799–1888), American politician from Delaware, US senator, son of James A. Bayard
Jean-François Bayard (1796–1853), French playwright
John Bayard (1738–1807), American statesman from Philadelphia, Pennsylvania; delegate to the Continental Congress
Marcel Bayard (1895–1956) French mathematician and prominent telecommunication engineer
Mary Temple Bayard (1853–1916), American writer, journalist
Nicholas Bayard (–1707), 16th mayor of New York, Peter Stuyvesant's brother-in-law, and founder of the Bayard family  
Nicholas Bayard (theologian), Dominican theologian
Pierre Bayard (1954–), French author and professor of literature
Pierre Terrail, seigneur de Bayard (Chevalier de Bayard) (1473–1524), French soldier, known as le chevalier sans peur et sans reproche
Richard H. Bayard (1796–1868), American politician from Delaware, mayor of Wilmington and US senator
Samuel Preston Bayard (1908–1997), American folklorist
Stephen Bayard, mayor of New York City from 1744 to 1747
Thomas F. Bayard (1828–1898), American politician, statesman, and senator
Thomas F. Bayard Jr. (1868–1942), American lawyer and politician, US senator from Delaware

French-language surnames